Albert Christian Kruyt (born 10 October 186919 January 1949) was a Dutch Calvinist missionary, ethnographer and theologian. He was the first to pioneer Christianity in Central Sulawesi, notably in Poso.

Born in Mojowarno, East Java in 1869, he grew up in a missionary family. In 1877, Kruyt was sent to the Netherlands to take missionary education. He returned to the Indies in 1890, and was stationed in Gorontalo. The Netherlands Missionary Society (Nederlandsch Zendeling Genootschap) sent him to open a new missionary post in Poso, located on the south shore of Tomini Bay. Kruyt started his work in 1892. The first years of his efforts were considered as failures, but the first baptism took place in 1909 and continued to grow in the following years. The mission area he had pioneered until the 1920s, continued to spread through the highlands and mountains to the Gulf of Bone in the south. Kruyt left the Dutch East Indies for good and returned to the Netherlands in 1932. In January 1949, he died in The Hague.

Kruyt is known for his ethno-sociological approach. In his duties as a missionary, he chooses to assimilate and study the civilizations of society first. According to him, without adequate ethnological knowledge, effort in spreading the Gospel is unlikely to succeed. Kruyt argues that a missionary must understand the connection between thought and community life in which he works to win their hearts to embrace Christianity. He prefers locals to embrace Christian voluntarily rather than through coercion.

Kruyt is considered one of the leading theorists, missionaries and ethnographers in the early period of the 20th century. The mission he led in Poso and Central Sulawesi was recognized as one of the greatest successes of the mission of the Gospel in the Indies. His works on ethnography and evangelism—particularly in Central Sulawesi—are regarded as an "extraordinary" source of information. The book he co-authored with Nicolaus Adriani, entitled  (The Bare'e speaking Toraja of Central Sulawesi), is considered one of the best publications in the field of ethnology, and is the primary source of research by scientists and researchers.

Kruyt was elected a corresponding member of the Royal Netherlands Academy of Arts and Sciences in 1898, he resigned in 1932. He became a regular member in 1933.

References

Sources

Bibliography 
Primary sources

  

Publications

 
  
  
  
 
  
  
  

1869 births
1949 deaths
People from Jombang Regency
Dutch Protestant missionaries
Dutch Calvinist and Reformed theologians
Indonesianists
Members of the Royal Netherlands Academy of Arts and Sciences
Protestant missionaries in Indonesia